St Cuthbert's Church is a Grade I listed parish church in the Church of England on Peasholme Green in York now known as St Cuthbert's House of Prayer.

History
The church dates from the 15th century. Around 1430 it was restored and largely rebuilt by William de Bowes MP, former Lord Mayor of York in 1417 and 1428. It was restored in 1859 when the stonework was repointed, the floor was levelled and the church was repewed. It was joined with St Michael le Belfrey and the church building was converted in 1980 into offices for that parish. It is now used as the St Cuthbert's House of Prayer.

Memorials
Richard Lund
Sarah Lund
Thomas Kilby (d. 1792)
Charles Mitley  (d. 1758)
Mary Mitley  (d. 1773)
Ann Simpson (d. 1836)

Organ
The pipe organ was built by William Denman and dates from 1964. A specification of the organ can be found on the National Pipe Organ Register. The  organ has gone and was moved to the Church of the Holy Spirit, Ewloe, Flintshire.

References

Cuthbert